Hydrophyllum canadense, known as bluntleaf waterleaf, broadleaf waterleaf, or Canada waterleaf, is a flowering plant in the borage family, Boraginaceae. It is native to the eastern United States and Canada.

Hydrophyllum canadense is one of ten species of Hydrophyllum, a genus endemic to North America. It can be distinguished from other Hydrophyllum species across its range by a combination of the following features: perennial, stem leaves palmately lobed, sepals lacking appendages (or less than 0.5 mm in length), and stamens exserted 3–6 mm.

References

canadense
Plants described in 1762
Flora of North America
Taxa named by Carl Linnaeus